Doppelganger is the fourth studio album by Kid Creole and the Coconuts, released in 1983. The album was a relative commercial and critical disappointment following the group's most popular album Tropical Gangsters/Wise Guy. The album was released on LP and cassette in September 1983 and peaked at #21 in the UK, and to moderate success throughout Europe but did not chart in the US. The album includes the singles "There's Something Wrong in Paradise", "The Lifeboat Party", and in the US "If You Wanna Be Happy". It was reissued by Universal Island Records with bonus tracks added to album in 2002.

The album includes two covers, "If You Wanna Be Happy" originally recorded by Jimmy Soul in 1963, and a remake of "The Seven Year Itch", a song by August Darnell's previous band Dr. Buzzard's Original Savannah Band. "The Seven Year Itch" was originally released on their third album Dr. Buzzard's Original Savannah Band Goes to Washington in 1979. Doppelganger also marked the renewal of Darnell's collaboration with his older brother Stony Browder Jr. Four songs including "The Seven Year Itch" were co-written by the brothers.

Critical reception

Doppelganger received mixed reviews from critics. Vince Ripol describes the album as entertaining, provided listeners have the prerequisite of an acquired taste for the bizarre, often comical travelogues set to exotic pop which represent the essence of Kid Creole & the Coconuts. The album is compared unfavourably to the group's previous hit album Tropical Gangsters/Wise Guy noting that nothing on Doppelganger can compare to "Annie, I'm Not Your Daddy" and "I'm a Wonderful Thing, Baby,", yet nothing will fail to satisfy devoted fans either. For the uninitiated, Doppelganger's peculiar content presents a love-it or hate-it dilemma.

Robert Christgau writing for The Village Voice rated the album A−. He calls the album a return to the musical comedy stage for yet another original-cast recording after his previous (and best) album some which Darnell called some kind of sellout because it's held together by a dance groove. Christgau also praises the apparently surface wit of the Kid's lyrical-musical synthesis-pastiche but wants to clarify just what these songs are about.

Track listing

Personnel

Performer credits
Adriana Kaegi, Bongo Eddie, Carol Colman, Charles Lagond, Cheryl Poirier, Coati Mundi, Dave Span, Ken Fradley, Kid Creole, Lee Robertson, Mark Mazur, Peter Schott, Taryn Hagey – The Boys in the Band
Andy Gonzalez, Buddy Williams, Charlie Story, Dave Friedman, Dian Sorel, Eddie Drennon, Eugene Grey, Francisco Centeno, Jerry Oland, Jill Jaffe & The Jaffettes, Jimmy Rippetoe, Joe Mannozzi, Jose Madera, Karen Joseph, Manny Oquendo, Mona Lagond, Phillipe Saisse, Felo Barito, Ron Barro, Steve Gerrios, Steve Kroon – extras
Cory Daye, Dutch Robinson, Gichy Dan, Conjunto Libre, Lori Eastside, Perri Lister – special appearances
Daryl Hall – special guest star ("Bongo Eddie's Lament")

Production credits
August Darnell – producer
Sugar Coated Andy Hernandez – associate producer
Carol Colman – production coordinator
Joe Barbaria, Michael H. Brauer, Julian McBrowne – chief engineer
Andy Heermans, Gary Hillman, Michael Abbott, Richard McClain, Steve Rinkoff – assistant engineer
Michael H. Brauer – mixing, Pond Life horns recording
Greg Calbi – mastering
Peter Ashworth – photography
Bruno Tilley – art direction
Tommy Mottola (Champion Entertainment Organization, Inc.) – management and direction
John Rynsky – continuity
Bora Bora Leoni – cordiality

Charts

References

1983 albums
Kid Creole and the Coconuts albums
Island Records albums
ZE Records albums